Benny Morris (born 8 December 1948) is an Israeli historian. He was a professor of history in the Middle East Studies department of Ben-Gurion University of the Negev in the city of Beersheba, Israel. He is a member of the group of Israeli historians known as the "New Historians," a term Morris coined to describe himself and historians Avi Shlaim, Ilan Pappé and Simha Flapan.

Morris's work on the Arab–Israeli conflict and especially the Israeli–Palestinian conflict has won praise and criticism from both sides of the political divide. Regarding himself as a Zionist, he writes, "I embarked upon the research not out of ideological commitment or political interest. I simply wanted to know what happened."

Biography
Morris was born on 8 December 1948 in kibbutz Ein HaHoresh, the son of Jewish immigrants from the United Kingdom.

His father, Ya'akov Morris, was an Israeli diplomat, historian, and poet, while his mother, Sadie Morris, was a journalist. According to The New Yorker, Benny Morris "grew up in the heart of a left-wing pioneering atmosphere." His parents moved to Jerusalem when Morris was a one-year-old. He later accompanied his parents to New York, where his father was an envoy in Israel’s foreign service.

Morris served in the Israel Defense Forces as an infantryman, including in the Paratroopers Brigade, from 1967 to 1969. He saw action on the Golan Heights front during the Six-Day War and served on the Suez Canal during the War of Attrition. He was wounded in 1969 by an Egyptian shell in the Suez Canal area and was discharged from active service four months later, but continued to serve in the military reserve until 1990. He completed his undergraduate studies in history at the Hebrew University of Jerusalem and received a doctorate in modern European history from the University of Cambridge.

Morris served in the 1982 Lebanon War as an army reservist, taking part in the Siege of Beirut in a mortar unit. In 1986, he did reserve duty in the West Bank. In 1988, when he was called up for reserve duty in Nablus, he refused to serve on ideological grounds, as he viewed Israeli withdrawal from the occupied territories as a necessity and did not want to take part in suppressing the First Intifada. He was sentenced to three weeks in military prison and was imprisoned for 19 days, with the remaining two deducted for good behavior. He was subsequently discharged from reserve service.

From 2015–18, Morris served as the Goldman Visiting Israeli Professor in Georgetown University's Department of Government.

He lives in Srigim (Li On) and is married with three children.

Journalism career
After graduation from the University of Cambridge he returned to Jerusalem and worked as a correspondent for The Jerusalem Post for 12 years. He covered the 1982 Lebanon War for The Jerusalem Post, a war he also fought in as a reservist.

While working at The Jerusalem Post in the 1980s, Morris began reading through Israeli government archives, at first looking at the history of the Palmach, then turning his attention to the origins of the 1948 Palestinian exodus. Mainstream Israeli historiography at the time explained the 1948 Palestinian exodus from their towns and villages as having been driven by fear, or by instructions from Arab leaders. Morris found evidence that there had been expulsions in some cases. Another event that Morris revealed for the first time based on his archive study was the contacts between the Israeli officials and the Lebanese Kataeb Party figures, including Elias Rababi, in the period 1948–1951. The related news reports were also published in The Jerusalem Post in 1983.

Political views
Critics allege that Morris's first book,The Birth of the Palestinian Refugee Problem, 1947—1949, is biased. Morris believes they failed to read his book with moral detachment, assuming that when he described Israeli actions as cruel or as atrocities, he was condemning them. In fact, he supports Israeli actions during 1948 such as the uprooting of 700,000 Palestinian Arabs, claiming that the only alternative to expelling them was the genocide of the Jewish population in Israel. In a 2004 interview with Haaretz conducted by Ari Shavit, Morris said that Israel was justified in uprooting the Palestinian 'fifth column' after the Arabs attacked the infant state, and that proportion should be employed when considering the "small war crimes" committed by Israel. In the interview, Morris stated that:

There is no justification for acts of rape. There is no justification for acts of massacre. Those are war crimes. But in certain conditions, expulsion is not a war crime. I don't think that the expulsions of 1948 were war crimes.

When Shavit called the 1948 Palestinian exodus "ethnic cleansing", Morris responded, "[t]here are circumstances in history that justify ethnic cleansing. I know that this term is completely negative in the discourse of the 21st century, but when the choice is between ethnic cleansing and genocide—the annihilation of your people—I prefer ethnic cleansing." Morris criticised David Ben-Gurion for not carrying out such a plan, saying: "In the end, he faltered. ... If he had carried out a full expulsion—rather than a partial one—he would have stabilized the State of Israel for generations." He expressed sympathy for the refugees but argued that after the Palestinians and Arab states had attacked, there was no choice but to expel them: "I feel sympathy for the Palestinian people, which truly underwent a hard tragedy. I feel sympathy for the refugees themselves. But if the desire to establish a Jewish state here is legitimate, there was no other choice. It was impossible to leave a large fifth column in the country. From the moment the Yishuv was attacked by the Palestinians and afterward by the Arab states, there was no choice but to expel the Palestinian population."

Morris told Shavit that his views changed in 2000 after the Palestinian rejection of President Clinton's peace accords and the beginning of the Second Intifada. He had originally viewed the First Intifada as a legitimate uprising against foreign occupation, and was imprisoned for refusing to serve in the occupied territories as a reservist. In contrast, he has characterized the Second Intifada as a war waged by the Palestinians against Israel with the intention of bringing Israeli society to a state of collapse. According to Morris, "The bombing of the buses and restaurants really shook me. They made me understand the depth of the hatred for us."

Morris told Shavit that he still describes himself as being left-wing because of his support for the two-state solution, but he believes his generation will not see peace in Israel. He has said, "I don't see the suicide bombings as isolated acts. They express the deep will of the Palestinian people. That is what the majority of the Palestinians want." On the subject of "people the Palestinian society sends to carry out the terrorist attacks," he calls them "serial killers" and "barbarians who want to take our lives".

In the same interview, Morris called Israeli Arabs "a time bomb," claiming that "their slide into complete Palestinization has made them an emissary of the enemy that is among us. They are a potential fifth column." On the subject of the potential expulsion of Israeli-Arabs, he stated that "in the present circumstances it is neither moral nor realistic. The world would not allow it, the Arab world would not allow it, it would destroy the Jewish society from within. But I am ready to tell you that in other circumstances, apocalyptic ones, which are liable to be realized in five or ten years, I can see expulsions. If we find ourselves with atomic weapons around us, or if there is a general Arab attack on us and a situation of warfare on the front with Arabs in the rear shooting at convoys on their way to the front, acts of expulsion will be entirely reasonable. They may even be essential."

Morris called the Israel–Palestinian conflict a facet of a global clash of civilisations between Islam and the Western World in the Haaretz interview, saying, "There is a deep problem in Islam. It's a world whose values are different. A world in which human life doesn't have the same value as it does in the West, in which freedom, democracy, openness and creativity are alien...Revenge plays a central part in the Arab tribal culture. Therefore, the people we are fighting and the society that sends them have no moral inhibitions."

He sees the Jews as the greater victims.

His work has been criticised by Arab writers for failing to act on the evidence he found of forced evictions.

In an op-ed piece in The New York Times in July 2008, Morris wrote: "Iran's leaders would do well to rethink their gamble and suspend their nuclear program. Bar this, the best they could hope for is that Israel's conventional air assault will destroy their nuclear facilities. To be sure, this would mean thousands of Iranian casualties and international humiliation. But the alternative is an Iran turned into a nuclear wasteland." In an interview with the Austrian newspaper Der Standard Morris argues that a pre-emptive nuclear strike on Iran may have to be used as a last resort to stop the Iranian nuclear program.

In July 2019, Morris has sharply criticized the restrictions under the Netanyahu government of access to historical documents related to the 1948 Palestinian Arab exodus, referring to them as "totalitarian."

In a 2019 interview with Haaretz, Morris took a pessimistic view of Israel's future, arguing that the Palestinians would not compromise and that ultimately "a situation in which we rule an occupied people that has no rights cannot persist in the 21st century, in the modern world". He claimed that as soon as the Palestinians did have rights, Israel would no longer be a Jewish state, and that it would descend into intercommunal violence with Jews ultimately becoming a persecuted minority and those who can emigrating. According to Morris, "the Palestinians look at everything from a broad, long-term perspective. They see that at the moment, there are five-six-seven million Jews here, surrounded by hundreds of millions of Arabs. They have no reason to give in, because the Jewish state can't last. They are bound to win. In another 30 to 50 years they will overcome us, come what may."

Criticisms of Morris' post-2000 views
Commenting on the post-2000 reversal of position by Morris, Shlomo Ben-Ami, former Israeli Minister of Foreign Affairs, wrote that Morris' more recent "thesis about the birth of the Palestine refugee problem being not by design but by the natural logic and evolution of war is not always sustained by the very evidence he himself provides: 'cultured officers ... had turned into base murderers and this not in the heat of battle ... but out of a system of expulsion and destruction; the less Arabs remained, the better; this principle is the political motor for the expulsions and atrocities' [quoting from Morris' major 2004 work: 'The Birth of the Palestinian Refugee Problem Revisited']".

Ari Shavit, senior correspondent at Haaretz, commented on Morris' justification for the expulsion of the Arabs in 1948 by contrasting (the more recent) "citizen" Morris with (the earlier) "historian" Morris, and noting that, at times "citizen Morris and historian Morris worked as though there is no connection between them, as though one was trying to save what the other insists on eradicating."

Published works
 The Birth of the Palestinian Refugee Problem, 1947–1949, Cambridge University Press, 1988. 
 Israel's Secret Wars: A History of Israel's Intelligence Services, with Ian Black, New York, Grove Weidenfeld, 1991. 
 Israel's Border Wars 1949–1956: Arab Infiltration, Israeli Retaliation, and the Countdown to the Suez War, Oxford, Clarendon Press, 1993. 
 1948 and after; Israel and the Palestinians, Clarendon Press, Oxford, 1994. 
 Righteous Victims: A History of the Zionist–Arab Conflict, 1881–1999. New York: Alfred A. Knopf. 2001 [Original in 1999] 
 Correcting a Mistake: Jews and Arabs in Palestine/Israel, 1936-1956, Am Oved Publishers, 2000.
 The Road to Jerusalem: Glubb Pasha, Palestine and the Jews. New York: I.B. Tauris, 2003. 
 The Birth of the Palestinian Refugee Problem Revisited, Cambridge University Press, 2004. 
 It is a revised edition of the 1988 book, which was the first comprehensive monograph on the subject. The updates in second edition are based on the opened Israeli state archives for the relevant period.
 Making Israel (ed), University of Michigan Press, 2008. 
 1948: A History of the First Arab–Israeli War, Yale University Press, 2008. 
 One State, Two States: Resolving the Israel/Palestine Conflict, Yale University Press, 2009. 
 The Thirty-Year Genocide: Turkey's Destruction of Its Christian Minorities, 1894-1924 (co-authored with Dror Ze'evi), Harvard University Press, 2019. 
 Sidney Reilly: Master Spy, Yale University Press, 2022.

The Birth of the Palestinian Refugee Problem, 1947–1949 
In his book  (1988), Morris argues that the 700,000 Palestinians who fled their homes in 1947 left mostly due to Israeli military attacks; fear of impending attacks; and expulsions. He argues that there was no centralised expulsion policy as such, but expulsions were ordered by the Israeli high command as needed. The official position in Israel was that the Palestinians had left voluntarily, or under pressure from Palestinian or other Arab leaders. At the same time, Morris documents atrocities by the Israelis, including cases of rape and torture. The book shows a map of 228 empty Palestinian villages, and attempts to explain why the villagers left. In 41 villages, he writes, the inhabitants were expelled by the IDF; in another 90, residents fled because of attacks on other villages; and in six, they left under instructions from local Palestinian authorities. He was unable to find out why another 46 villages were abandoned.

In his updated The Birth of the Palestinian Refugee Problem Revisited (2004), Morris answers critics of the first version and adds material from the opening of new Israeli government archives. He writes that the contents of the new documents substantially increase both Israeli and Palestinian responsibility for the refugee problem, revealing more expulsions and atrocities on the Israeli side, and more orders from Arab officials to the Palestinians to leave their villages, or at least to send their women and children away. Morris writes that his conclusions are unlikely to please either Israeli or Palestinian propagandists, or "black-or-white historians".

1948 and After
1948 and After: Israel and the Palestinians is a collection of essays dedicated to the Palestinian exodus of 1948 and subsequent events. It analyses Mapai and Mapam policy during the exodus, the IDF report of July 1948 on its causes, Yosef Weitz's involvement in the events, and some cases of expulsions that occurred in the fifties. Although Morris dismisses the claim that the Palestinians were systematically expelled due to orders from Israeli officials, he nevertheless cites an IDF Intelligence Report that concludes that 70% of the exodus was caused by Israeli forces and 'Jewish dissidents.

The IDF report lists: 'the factors that precipitated the exodus in order of importance—

 direct, hostile Jewish [Haganah/IDF] operations against Arab settlements.
 the effect of our [Haganah/IDF] hostile operations on nearby Arab settlements
 Operations of the Jewish dissidents [the Irgun Z'va'i Leumi and Lohamei Herut Yisrael]'

Collectively these 3 factors were considered to be responsible for causing 70% of the exodus, according to the IDF report. Furthermore, Morris states 'the report makes no mention of any blanket order issued over Arab radio stations or through other means, to the Palestinians to evacuate their homes and villages' despite as Morris states the IDF 'monitoring Arab radio transmissions'.

Righteous Victims (1999)
Righteous Victims: A history of the Zionist–Arab Conflict, 1881–2001 is based largely on secondary works and gives a synthesis of existing research on the various subjects and periods covered. Morris writes "a history of this subject, based mainly on primary sources is, I suspect, beyond the abilities of a single scholar. There are simply too many archives, files, and documents. Nonetheless, parts of the present book-the coverage of the 1948 war and the decade after it, and of certain episodes that occurred during the 1930s and the 1982–85 Lebanon War—are based in large measure on primary sources."

Making Israel
Edited by Morris, this collection of articles was written by "traditionalists and revisionists who openly and directly lay out their key insights about Israel's origins". The articles can be downloaded from the website of the University of Michigan Press.

1948: A History of the First Arab–Israeli War
In 1948, Morris gives a detailed account of the war between various factions that year that caused the creation of the modern state of Israel. Yoav Gelber writes, "1948 is a praiseworthy achievement of research and analysis, the work of a historian unwilling to rest on his already considerable laurels." Gelber disagrees with some of Morris's analysis, in particular with the idea that the 1948 war was more a "clash of civilizations" between the West and Islam than a nationalist struggle. He also argues that Morris overestimates Israel's military strength, and disagrees with Morris about the aims of King Abdullah of Jordan.

One State, Two States
Morris contends that there is no two-state solution to the Middle East crisis, and that the one-state solution is not viable because of Arab unwillingness to accept a Jewish national presence in the Middle East and cultural differences including less Arab respect for human life and rule of law. He suggests the possibility of something like a three-state solution in the form of a Palestinian confederation with Jordan.

The Thirty-Year Genocide, Turkey's Destruction of its Christian Minorities, 1894-1924

The book describes the Ottoman\Turkish destruction of the Armenian, Greek and Assyrian communities by the successive Ottoman, Young Turks' and Atatürk regimes, in which some two million Christians were murdered by their Muslim neighbors.

Praise and criticism
Avi Shlaim, retired professor of international relations at the University of Oxford, and himself a New Historian, writes that Morris investigated the 1948 exodus of the Palestinians "as carefully, dispassionately, and objectively as it is ever likely to be", and that The Birth of the Palestinian Refugee Problem is an "outstandingly original, scholarly, and important contribution" to the study of the issue.

Many of Morris's critics cling to the tenets of "Old History", the idea of an Israel born untarnished, a David fighting the Arab Goliath, Shlaim writes. He argues that these ideas are simply false, created not by historians but by the participants in the 1948 war, who wrote about the events they had taken part in without the benefit of access to Israeli government archives, which were first opened up in the early 1980s. Another group of Morris's critics such as Avraham Sela, as well as historians on the left such as Ilan Pappé, argue that he has relied too heavily on Israeli sources and hardly at all on the Arabs. Norman Finkelstein, Nur Masalha and others argue that Morris has been too soft on the Israelis, often ignoring the force of his own evidence. Efraim Karsh alleges that Morris has distorted source material, an allegation not accepted by other historians.

Efraim Karsh

Efraim Karsh, professor of Mediterranean Studies at King's College London, writes that Morris engages in what Karsh calls "five types of distortion". According to Karsh, Morris "misrepresents documents, resorts to partial quotes, withholds evidence, makes false assertions, and rewrites original documents... [he] tells of statements never made, decisions never taken, events that never happened ... at times [he] does not even take the trouble to provide evidence..... He expects his readers to take on trust his assertions that fundamental contradictions exist between published accounts and the underlying documents.....he systematically falsifies evidence. Indeed, there is scarcely a document that he does not twist. This casts serious doubt on the validity of his entire work." In addition he claimed to expose a serious gap between Morris' text and the original diary of Ben-Gurion, the first prime minister of Israel.

Yezid Sayigh, professor of Middle East Studies in the Department of War Studies at King's College London, writes of Karsh's criticism, "[t]his is not the first time that Efraim Karsh has written a highly self-important rebuttal of revisionist history. He is simply not what he makes himself out to be, a trained historian (nor political/social scientist)." (Karsh responds that he has an undergraduate degree in modern Middle Eastern history, and Arabic language and literature, and a doctorate in political science and international relations.) Sayigh urges academics to compose "robust responses [to Karsh] that make sure that any self-respecting scholar will be too embarrassed to even try to incorporate the Karsh books in his/her teaching or research because they can't pretend they didn't know how flimsy their foundations are".

Morris responds that Karsh's article is a "mélange of distortions, half-truths, and plain lies that vividly demonstrates his profound ignorance of both the source material (his piece contains more than fifty footnotes but is based almost entirely on references to and quotations from secondary works, many of them of dubious value) and the history of the Zionist–Arab conflict. It does not deserve serious attention or reply." Anita Shapira, Dean of Tel Aviv University, argues "thirty of [Karsh's] references actually refer to writings by Shlaim and Morris, and fifteen others cite primary sources, and the rest refer to studies by major historians...."

Morris elsewhere argues that Karsh "belabor[s] minor points while completely ignoring, and hiding from his readers, the main pieces of evidence" and argued, "... Karsh, while claiming to have 'demolished' the whole oeuvre, in fact deal[t] with only four pages of Birth. These pages tried to show that the Zionist leadership during 1937–38 supported a 'transfer solution' to the prospective Jewish state's 'Arab problem.'" Commenting on the Revisited version of Morris'work, Karsh states that in "an implicit acknowledgement of their inaccuracy, Morris has removed some of The Birth's most inaccurate or distorted quotations about transfer."

Finkelstein and Masalha

Morris has also been criticised by Norman Finkelstein and Nur Masalha. They argue that Morris's conclusions have a pro-Israeli bias, in that:
 Morris did not fully acknowledge that his work rests largely on selectively released Israeli documentation, while the most sensitive documents remain closed to researchers.
 Morris treated the evidence in the Israeli documents in an uncritical way, and did not take into account that they are, at times, apologetics.
 Morris minimised the number of expulsions: Finkelstein asserts that in the table in which Morris summarises causes of abandonment, village by village, many cases of "military assault on settlement (M)" should have been "expulsions (E)".
 Morris's conclusions were skewed with respect to the evidence he himself presents, and when the conclusions are harsh for the Israelis he tended to give them a less incriminating spin.
Both Finkelstein and Masalha prefer the conclusion that there was a transfer policy.

In a reply to Finkelstein and Masalha, Morris answers he "saw enough material, military and civilian, to obtain an accurate picture of what happened", that Finkelstein and Masalha draw their conclusions with a pro-Palestinian bias, and that with regard to the distinction between military assault and expulsion they should accept that he uses a "more narrow and severe" definition of expulsions. Morris holds to his conclusion that there was no transfer policy. Shlomo Ben Ami states that Benny Morris' conclusion is not supported by the evidence that he himself (Morris) presents such as his statement that, "cultured officers . . . had turned into base murderers and this not in the heat of battle . . . but out of a system of expulsion and destruction; the less Arabs remained, the better; this principle is the political motor for the expulsions and the atrocities".

Ilan Pappé

Benny Morris wrote a review critical of Ilan Pappé's book A History of Modern Palestine for The New Republic. Morris called Pappé's book "truly appalling". He says it subjugates history to political ideology, and "contains errors of a quantity and a quality that are not found in serious historiography". Replying, Pappé accused Morris of using mainly Israeli sources, and disregarding Arab sources, which he cannot read.

Michael Palumbo

Michael Palumbo, author of The Palestinian Catastrophe: The 1948 Expulsion of a People from Their Homeland, reviewing the first edition of Morris's book on Palestinian refugees, criticises Morris's decision, which Palumbo thinks characteristic of Israeli revisionist historians generally, to rely mainly on official, "carefully screened" Israeli sources, especially for radio transcripts of Arab broadcasts, while disregarding unofficial Israeli sources such as transcripts from the BBC and CIA, many of which point to a policy of expulsion. He says Morris failed to supplement his work in Israeli archives, many still classified, by U.N., American, and British archival sources that Palumbo considers objective on such issues as IDF atrocities, as well as oral testimonies of Palestinians and Israelis, which can be reliable if their substance can be independently verified. Palumbo says:Morris' regard for documentation is indeed commendable, were it not for his tendency to choose sources which support his views, while avoiding those document collections which contain information inconsistent with his principal arguments. His decision not to use the testimony of Israeli veterans is unfortunate, since some of them have spoken candidly about Israeli atrocities and expulsion of civilians at Deir Yassin, Lydda–Ramle and Jaffa.

Awards and recognition
 2008: National Jewish Book Award in the History category for 1948: A History of the First Arab-Israeli War

See also

 Exodus of Palestinians in 1948
 1948 Palestinian exodus from Lydda and Ramle
 Causes of the 1948 Palestinian exodus
 History of Israel
 Palestinian refugee

References

External links

 Claremont Review of Books on Benny Morris and 1948
 Morris, Benny. Camp David and After: An Exchange (1. An Interview with Ehud Barak), continued, The New York Review of Books 9 August 2001;
 Benny Morris essay regarding a nuclear Iran, The Jerusalem Post, January 18 2007
 Israel Revisited Benny Morris, Veteran 'New Historian' of the Modern Jewish State's Founding, Finds Himself Ideologically Back Where It All Began, by Scott Wilson, The Washington Post Foreign Service, 11 March 2007
 'New Historian' Shifts from Old View of Israel Israeli "new historian" Benny Morris was online Monday, 12 March, at 2 pm. ET to discuss his books and changing views that have driven him away from the critical perspective of Israeli history that he helped create.
 Benny Morris meets his readers at the International Book Fair of Turin 
 Review of Benny Morris' book "1948: The First Arab-Israeli War" in Jewish Literary Review
 1 hour interview of Benny Morris about the 1948 war (2008)
 Journal of Palestinian Studies Vol 21(1), p. 98–114 :Morris Response to Finklestein and Masalah
 History in the (almost) making, Ynetnews, November 2007
 ISRAEL AT 60: From Dove to Hawk Newsweek 8 May 2008
  On RT CrossTalk 21 May 2010
 Israel and the Palestinians (the Irish Times)

1948 births
Living people
Alumni of the University of Cambridge
Academic staff of Ben-Gurion University of the Negev
Critics of Islam
Hebrew University of Jerusalem alumni
Israeli historians
New Historians
Anti-Islam sentiment in Israel
Israeli Jews
Israeli people of British-Jewish descent
Israeli political writers
Jewish historians
People from Jerusalem
Zionists
Palestine ethnographers